KUD Idijoti was a punk rock band from Pula, Croatia. The name of the band translates to Cultural Artistic Society "Idiots" The word Idijoti is deliberately spelled wrong, the correct Croatian form of the word being idioti. The prefix 'KUD' (in full, kulturno-umjetničko društvo – cultural-artistic society) is a common designation for amateur folklore dance and music groups in the ex-Yugoslav countries.

History
The band was formed in 1981 and released its debut album in 1986. In 1987 they won the Youth Festival prize in Subotica in competition with over 300 bands and quickly gained recognition as one of the most popular bands on the punk scene of the former Yugoslavia. After winning the first prize they have gained international popularity, performing live in Switzerland, Germany, Hungary and Italy. Particularly in Italy in Reggio Calabria, the festival of Mediterranean countries almost turned into an international incident, after carabinieri stopped the performance of the famous communist song Bandiera Rossa.

Their compilation album, "Bolivia R'N'R", compilation of the first three singles and three previously unreleased songs, was published in January 1990 by the independent German record label "Incognito Records." In May of the same year they published the next album "Mi smo ovdje samo zbog para" (We are Only Here for the Money), which until now went on to become their biggest selling album. Due to the breakup of Yugoslavia, the release of their third album, "Glupost je neuništiva" (Stupidity is indestructible) was briefly delayed, and consequently released at the end of 1992. Next year they published the album "Tako je govorio Zaratusta" (Thus Spoke Zaratusta), which was also their first album was released on CD. This album contains on one of their most famous songs: "Za tebe" (For You), and the cover of the Italian partisan song Bella Ciao.

In 1994, the band went on tour in Germany, Switzerland and Macedonia, and they performed at Sziget Festival in Budapest. Another significant performance was held on 10 October of the same year in Ljubljana's Tivoli Hall, where KUD Idijoti played as the opening act for the American punk rock band Ramones.

In 1995, the band released the album  (wordplay of a very common curse and "Mother Istria") in collaboration with the Pula composition band Gori Ussi Winnetou. Immediately after releasing the album, Radio Pazin was banned because of its broadcast of the song "Turbo Cattolica" which mentions Pazin Inquisitor.

1995 and 1996 saw the creation of another two studio albums, LP "Megapunk" and EP "Fuck". Megapunk and Fuck received positive critical reviews. In early 1997. band signed with the record label Dancing Bear, and released the album "Cijena ponosa" (Price of pride). In 1999 they published  "Gratis hits live", the album with appearances in club Uljanik Pula, on the occasion of the band's 18th birthday. KUD Idijoti remained popular in other countries of the former Yugoslavia, and have frequently toured throughout its former member republics.

"Remek djelo" (Masterpiece), their last album, was published in 2001 and followed by the promotional concert tour.

Apart from Franci Blašković, band members have collaborated with Peter Lovšin, singer of the Slovenian punk band Pankrti, Šajeta and Hladno pivo.

In 2011, Singer Branko Črnac "Tusta" was diagnosed with lung and throat cancer, and the band went on an indefinite hiatus. A number of humanitarian concerts were organised which were used to raise funds to help with the treatment, but Tusta died on 14 October 2012 from this disease, at the age of 57.

A few days following his death, the lead guitarist and founder of the band, Sale Veruda, declared that with the death of Tusta KUD Idijoti as a band have ceased to exist.

Band Members 
Branko Črnac Tusta – vocals 
Saša Milovanović, a.k.a. Sale Veruda – guitar, back vocals
Davor Zgrabljić – bass guitar and back vocals
Dejan Gotal – drums

Former Band Members 
Diego Bozusco Ptica – drums (1985–1999) 
Nenad Marijanović Fritz – bass (1985–1999) 
Kristijan Bijažić Picek – drums (1999–2000)
Egidio Rocco – drums 
Marino Piuko – guitar

Discography 
Legendarni u živo (1986)
Bolje izdati ploču nego prijatelja (1987)
Lutke na koncu (1987)
Hoćemo cenzuru (1988)
Live in Biel (1988)
Bolivia R'n'R (1989)
Mi smo ovdje samo zbog para (1990)
Đuro was sold out (1991)
Glupost je neuništiva (1992)
Tako je govorio Zaratusta (1993)
Istra ti materina (1995)
Megapunk (1995)
Fuck (1996)
Single collection vol 1 (1997)
Cijena ponosa (1997)
Gratis hits live! (1999)
Remek-djelo (2001)
Tako je govorio Zaratusta (2002)

Antifascist Songs Covered 
O Bella ciao
Bandiera Rossa

See also
Punk rock in Yugoslavia

References

External links

 
 KUD Idijoti at Hrvatska Punk Lektira

Croatian rock music groups
Yugoslav punk rock groups
Croatian punk rock groups
Musical groups established in 1981